The State Farm College Baseball Showdown is an annual six-team college baseball tournament held in Arlington, Texas and hosted by the Rangers Foundation at Globe Life Field.

Competitors

Teams by number of appearances

See also
 Shriners College Classic

References

External links

Annual events in Texas
College baseball tournaments in the United States
Recurring sporting events established in 2021
 
College sports tournaments in Texas
Baseball competitions in Arlington, Texas